The 1985 San Jose Earthquakes season was the twelfth overall for the Earthquakes franchise. They played in the four-team Western Alliance Challenge Series, 
which would become the Western Soccer Alliance in 1986. The Earthquakes finished in first place and were league champions.

Squad
The 1985 squad

Competitions

Western Alliance Challenge Series

Match results 

Source:

Standings

References

External links
The Year in American Soccer – 1985 | WSA
San Jose Earthquakes Game Results | Soccerstats.us

San Jose Earthquakes seasons
San Jose
1985 in sports in California